Ronald Maitland Simpson (1896–1957) was a British film, TV, and stage actor. He was a publicist, too, known for BBC Sunday-Night Theatre (1950).  He was married to Doris Lila Muschamp.

Selected filmography
 One Precious Year (1933) - (uncredited)
 The Medicine Man (1933) - Dr. Wesley Primus
 It's a Cop (1934) - Bates
 Lucky Days (1935) - Smedley
 Calling the Tune (1936) - Bramwell
 Song of Freedom (1936) - Mr. Blane, the Pianist
 Head Office (1936) - Knott
 No Escape (1936) - Scoop Martin
 The Loves of Joanna Godden (1947) - Rev. Brett
 Mine Own Executioner (1947) - Mr. Grandison
 Last Holiday (1950) - Dr. Pevensey
 The Long Dark Hall (1951) - Mary's father
 The House in the Square (1951) - Sir Joshua Reynolds (uncredited)
 The Cruel Sea (1953) - R.N. Captain
 The Last Man to Hang? (1956) - Dr. Cartwright

References

Bibliography
 Scott Allen Nollen. Paul Robeson: Film Pioneer. McFarland, 2010.

External links

1896 births
1957 deaths
British male television actors
British male film actors
British male stage actors
Male actors from London